Euchiton collinus, the creeping cudweed, is a herb native to Australia and New Zealand. It has become naturalized in a few places in the United States (California, Oregon).

Leaves form a basal rosette surrounding the base of the stem and also individually farther up the stem. Each head has 40-60 pistillate flowers around the edge of the head plus 3-5 bisexual florets toward the center.

References

Gnaphalieae
Flora of Australia
Plants described in 1806